This list of Mozart symphonies of spurious or doubtful authenticity contains 39 symphonic works whose initial attribution to Wolfgang Amadeus Mozart has subsequently been proved spurious, or is the subject of continuing doubt. The number of symphonies actually written by Mozart is imprecisely known; of the 41 formally numbered, three (Nos. 2, 3 and 37) are established as by other composers and another, No. 11 (K. 84/73q), is considered by scholars to be of uncertain authenticity. Outside the accepted sequence 1–41, however, there are around twenty other genuine Mozart symphonies, and beyond these, a larger number of problematic works which have not been authenticated as Mozart's. Some of these may be genuine; dubious works are often treated as authentic by the compilers of collected editions—eight (K. 76/42a, K. Anh. 214/45b, K. 81/73l, K. 97/73m, K. 95/73n, K. 84/73q, K. 75, and K. 96/111b) are in the main body of the 1991 Neue Mozart-Ausgabe (NMA: English New Mozart Edition), and another two (K. Anh. 220/16a and K. Anh. 216/74g/Anh.C 11.03) are included in the supplementary 2000 volume of works of doubtful authenticity. Some, however, have long been accepted as the works of other composers, who in many instances have been positively identified.

Many of the authentication difficulties arise from early Mozart symphonies, where original autograph scores are missing. In some instances the main body of the work has been entirely lost, its identity being preserved only through an incipit (record of the opening few bars) cataloged by Breitkopf & Härtel, who published the Alte Mozart-Ausgabe (AMA) in 1883. The informal 18th century methods of publishing and distributing musical works caused additional confusion. Cataloging errors based on inadequate information, and an occasional over-eagerness to attribute new discoveries to Mozart has added to the problem. However, the "spurious and doubtful" list of symphonies is not fixed, as new evidence can sometimes lead to authentication; it can also throw doubt upon, or disqualify, symphonies once generally accepted as genuine Mozart.

Reasons for misattribution

There are numerous reasons why symphonic works have been misattributed to Mozart. For example:
A habit of the youthful Mozart was to copy parts of the music of other composers, for his own study purposes. The later discoveries of music scores, or fragments, in Mozart's hand, sometimes led to the belief that the work was his. In particular this factor has led to confusion between the early symphonies of Wolfgang and those of his father Leopold, and also those of other composers in the Mozart circle such as Michael Haydn.
Mozart, when a mature composer and performer, would sometimes include the work of another—usually young and struggling—composer in one of his regular symphony concerts. Although he would present the true composer to the audience, the work's tenuous association with Mozart would sometimes lead to a continuing belief that he was the composer.
Musical publishing and distribution methods were very lax in 18th century Europe, with manuscript versions of music being freely circulated. This could easily lead to confusion about authorship, and frequent misattribution.
Early inaccuracies in identifying Mozart's works, for example by the Hamburg music dealer Johann Christoph Westphal, were carried forward into the later formal cataloguing by Breitkopf and Härtel and Köchel, and had a tendency to persist.
An unknown number of Mozart's works are lost. Occasional "finds" of late 18th century music, particularly in places which have association with Mozart through personal visits or concert performances, have sometimes been rather hastily attributed to him, only to be disqualified on the discovery of contrary evidence.

Köchel catalogue: explanation
The Köchel catalogue, generally accepted as the definitive listing of Mozart's works, was published by Ludwig von Köchel in 1862, and has been revised and updated on several subsequent occasions. The original catalogue, known as K1, listed incomplete or lost works in an appendix or "Anhang", without regard to chronological order. These works were identified by an "Anh.", not a "K" number. In the last major revision of the catalogue (1964, K6), the Anhang was extended to include doubtful and spurious works. On the basis of the most recent research and discoveries, some of the old K1 Anhangs were promoted to "K" status, while others were relegated from the main catalogue into the K6 Anhang. However, as Zaslaw points out, the Köchel catalogue allocations between main listing and Anhang are not reliable indicators of authenticity or otherwise. Zaslaw deems some of the divisions "arbitrary", and calls for "clearer, more honest categories" for the problematic works.

"Deest" is used to identify works that have not been included in any of the Köchel catalogue versions, but which have at some stage in the past been thought of as Mozart compositions.

Mozart's symphonies of spurious authenticity

Mozart's symphonies of doubtful authenticity

See also
List of compositions by Wolfgang Amadeus Mozart

Notes and references

Sources